Jean-Joseph Sue or Jean-Joseph Sue (son) ( – ) was a French physician and surgeon during the Napoleonic Era. He was the father of Eugène Sue.

Biography
He was born in Paris. His father was Jean-Joseph Sue père (1710–1792), who came from a 14 physicians family since Louis XIV.
He received the Master of Surgery from the University of Paris in 1781 then earned his M.D. from the Royal College of Physicians of Edinburgh in 1783. His elder brother was Pierre Sue.

He did not succeed his father to the Hôpital de la Charité where he only took a position of surgeon substitute but he retrieved his father's professorship of anatomy at the Académie royale de peinture et de sculpture, where he served as professor from 8 March 1789. He also taught anatomy at the Atheneum and the Royal School of surgery, and delivered his care to a thriving clientele in its own cabinet.

Sue did not hesitate to take a responsible position as a citizen and a doctor before the National Convention. He was opposed to the guillotine, convinced of the suffering of the beheaded in each piece of his body once the head separated from the body "because the impression of pain warns quickly the center of thought about what happens". Sue had conducted several experiments on animals following the controversial and sensational beheading of Charlotte Corday to prove his point. The physiologist Pierre Jean George Cabanis was not convinced that Sue theory was correct.

In 1800, he was appointed Chief Medical Officer of the Consular Guard then Imperial Guard hospital by Bonaparte. For ten years, he succeeded in staying in France and avoiding the front. But in 1812, Napoleon decreeded that the Chief Medical Officer was to accompany his Guard everywhere. Sue soon became very sick and was back in Paris in June.

He was the doctor of Joséphine de Beauharnais and of Joseph Fouché.

During the Restoration, he became Surgeon Consultant of Louis XVIII.

Family life
Jean Joseph Sue II was married three times and had a total of five children. He divorced his first wife. Eugène and his sister Victorine were born from his second marriage with Marie Sophie Tison de Reilly or Derilly in 1803.

Honours
 Knight of the Empire
 Officer of the Legion of Honor
 Fellow of the Royal Academy of Surgery
 Fellow of the Royal Academy of Medicine
Member of the American Philosophical Society (1785)

Works

References 

French anatomists
French surgeons
1760 births
1830 deaths
Members of the American Philosophical Society